Joseph F. Shrader is a retired United States Marine Corps major general who last served as the Commanding General of the Marine Corps Logistics Command since June 14, 2018 to July 18, 2022. Previously, he served as the Commander of the Marine Corps Systems Command from July 11, 2014, to May 22, 2018.

References

External links

Year of birth missing (living people)
Living people
Place of birth missing (living people)
United States Marine Corps generals
Military personnel from West Virginia
People from Princeton, West Virginia